Harriet Moore may refer to:

Harriet Bowell, the wife of former Canadian Prime Minister Mackenzie Bowell, 
Harriet Jane Moore, British watercolorist.